This is a list of airlines currently operating in Togo.

See also
 List of airlines
 List of defunct airlines of Togo
 List of companies based in Togo

References

Togo
Airlines
Airlines
Togo